Charles H. Chuckovitz (July 10, 1912 – August 12, 1991) was an American professional basketball player in the 1930s and 1940s.

A 6'1" guard-forward who starred at St. Vincent–St. Mary High School, he became an All-American at the University of Toledo. He broke Ohio's single-season and career collegiate scoring marks, both previously held by  Wooster star Nick Frascella. He also set a three-year intercollegiate scoring record with 1,149 points.

Chuckovitz played two seasons in the National Basketball League as a member of the Hammond Ciesar All-Americans and the Toledo Jim White Chevrolets. He received league MVP honors with Toledo during the 1941–42 season after leading the NBL with an 18.5 points per game average, which was a new single-season record. He was also the top scorer at the 1941 World Professional Basketball Tournament held in Chicago, recording a tournament-record 82 points in four games while leading Toledo to a third-place finish.

Chuckovitz coached high school basketball, including stints at Holland High School and Waite High School.

References

1912 births
1991 deaths
All-American college men's basketball players
American men's basketball players
College men's basketball referees in the United States
Hammond Ciesar All-Americans players
National Basketball Association referees
Basketball players from Akron, Ohio
Sportspeople from Toledo, Ohio
Toledo Jim White Chevrolets players
Toledo Rockets men's basketball players
Forwards (basketball)
Guards (basketball)
St. Vincent–St. Mary High School alumni